Seema Kumari  is an Indian politician and a member of Bharatiya Janata Party (BJP).

Personal life

Kumari is married to Vinod Kumar.

Political career
Kumari was elected sarpanch of Lahri village in 2008 and in 2012 was elected to the Punjab Legislative Assembly from Bhoa, a constituency then reserved for candidates from Scheduled Castes and Scheduled Tribes. Then aged 33, she was the youngest member of the assembly.

Kumari stood as a candidate in the 2017 state assembly elections but faced criticism because of suspicions regarding an increase in her income. Described as the poorest MLA in the state in 2012, based on her declared assets in an election affidavit, they had grown almost 30-fold by 2017. She lost her seat in Bhoa to Joginder Pal of the Indian National Congress.

References

Punjab, India MLAs 2012–2017
People from Pathankot district
Bharatiya Janata Party politicians from Punjab
Year of birth missing (living people)
Living people
21st-century Indian women politicians
21st-century Indian politicians
Women members of the Punjab Legislative Assembly